Marcos André Sousa da Silva Freitas  (born 8 April 1988) is a Portuguese table tennis player who has won European Championships in singles, doubles, and team events.

He participated at the 2008 Summer Olympics in Beijing where he got knocked out in the Round of 64. In the same year he won the bronze medal in the men's doubles at the European Championship with Tiago Apolónia. Three years later at the 2011 Table Tennis European Championships he went on to win the gold medal with his doubles partner Andrej Gaćina. In 2012 he took part on his second Olympics, reaching the Round of 32 in the singles and the quarterfinals in the team event with Tiago Apolónia and João Monteiro. In June 2015, he competed in the inaugural European Games, for Portugal in table tennis, more specifically, Men's team with João Geraldo and Tiago Apolonia. He earned a gold medal. At the European Championships 2015 he won Silver in the Singles Event.  He reached the quarterfinals of the 2016 Olympics in the individual event.  Although he won his match, Portugal lost in the first round of the team event.

As of August 2016, he is ranked the number eleven player in the world.

Since 2012, Freitas lives in Schwechat and practices at the Werner Schlager Academy.

Honors
 European Championship – Men's Doubles:
 Winner: 2011
 Bronze medalist: 2008
 Pro A:
 Runner-up: 2013
 European Champions League:
 Winner: 2014
 Semifinalist: 2013

See also
 List of table tennis players

References

External links
 

1988 births
Living people
Olympic table tennis players of Portugal
Table tennis players at the 2008 Summer Olympics
Table tennis players at the 2012 Summer Olympics
Table tennis players at the 2016 Summer Olympics
Table tennis players at the 2020 Summer Olympics
Table tennis players at the 2015 European Games
European Games gold medalists for Portugal
European Games medalists in table tennis
Sportspeople from Funchal
Table tennis players at the 2019 European Games
European Games bronze medalists for Portugal
Kinoshita Meister Tokyo players
Portuguese expatriate sportspeople in Japan
Expatriate table tennis people in Japan
Portuguese male table tennis players